Ohr Avner Foundation is a philanthropic foundation that was established in 1992 by the Israeli billionaire and émigré from the former Soviet Union, Lev Leviev and is managed by its Director Rabbi David Mondshine (son of Chabad scholar, Rabbi Yehoshua Mondshine). The foundation was named in memory of Lev Leviev's father Rabbi Avner Leviev. It supports a large network of  Jewish educational institutions in the former Soviet Union, such as Jewish day schools, kindergartens and youth camps, a resource center and a  teachers training institute.

History

While Jewish life in the countries of the former Soviet Union has existed for centuries, religious persecution reached new depths under 72 years of Communism. Jews who tried to uphold their faith and their traditions were harassed and often arrested, tortured and condemned to hard labor or executed.
The remaining communities were decimated by World War II - bombardment, famine and, above all, the Holocaust wiped out three million Soviet Jews and left the rest shattered and forlorn. By the end of the 20th Century, Jewish life had all but ceased, and even those few who practiced Judaism in secret were left with little knowledge of their rich cultural and religious heritage.

The Lubavitcher Rebbe, Rabbi Menachem M. Schneerson, relocated from Soviet Russia in 1927. From 1941 he directed a vast clandestine network of Jewish education, prayer services and humanitarian aid from his base in New York. Jewish activists risked their lives to keep the embers of Judaism alive by performing ritual circumcisions in secret, smuggling in haggadahs and matzoh at Passover, delivering kosher food to the starving and other acts of courage and compassion.
The collapse of the Soviet system offered the third-largest Jewish population in the world the opportunity to worship freely for the first time in seven decades. More than 1 million Soviet Jews left for Israel and the United States, leaving at least 2 million to rebuild the ruins of Jewish community life with generous support from the Diaspora.

Veterans of the Underground who remained, Jewish leaders who emerged after the fall of Communism and dozens of rabbis sent by
Chabad-Lubavitch began building a new infrastructure of synagogues, community centers and day schools throughout the vast territory stretching through ten time zones. The latent embers kept alive by the Jewish underground movement burst into flames to restore literally hundreds of Jewish communities.

In November 1998, leaders of these dispersed communities recognized the need for a united and efficient umbrella group. They pooled their professional, financial and technical resources to create the Federation of Jewish Communities of the CIS.

See also
Africa Israel Investments
Azerbaijani Jews
Bais Yaakov Machon Academy
Bukharian Jews
Bukhara
Bukhari language
Dushanbe synagogue
Emirate of Bukhara
History of the Jews in Russia and the Soviet Union
Kazakh Jews
Mountain Jews
Persian Jews
Tajik Jews
Uzbek Jews

External links
About Ohr Avner: Official site

Bukharan Jews topics
Jewish charities based in Israel
Jewish educational organizations
Chabad organizations
Jews and Judaism in the Soviet Union
Post-Soviet states